Château de Lorentzen is a castle in the commune of Lorentzen, in the department of Bas-Rhin, Alsace, France, which dates from the Middle Ages . 

It is a listed historical monument since 1990.

References

Castles in Bas-Rhin
Monuments historiques of Bas-Rhin